The Central Chancery of the Orders of Knighthood, or simply the Central Chancery, is an office of the Lord Chamberlain’s department within the Royal Household of the Sovereign of the United Kingdom. It is responsible for the administration of orders of chivalry and some aspects of honours in general. It does not deal with nominations or decisions on appointments, but rather administers the appointment procedures and investitures, and provides the insignia. It is a small office, with eight staff in 2019.

History and duties 

The office was established by King Edward VII in April 1904 in response to the recommendations of a committee set up in 1902 to consider changes to the administration of the honours system. The new office replaced the ad hoc arrangements which had evolved over time. The Central Chancery is headed by a Secretary, who is assisted by an Assistant Secretary.

Since 1991, the Secretary of the Central Chancery has been the same individual who serves as Assistant Comptroller to the Lord Chamberlain's Office, and currently serves ex-officio as the registrar of the Royal Victorian Order and of the Order of the British Empire.

Since 1931, the office has been held by retired officers of the Armed Forces.

List of Secretaries 

 Sir Francis Morgan Bryant  (1916–1931)
 Rear Admiral Philip John Hawkins Lander Row  (1931–1932)
 Commander Dudley Colles  (1932–1936)
 Major Sir Henry Hudson Fraser Stockley  (1936–1946)
 Brigadier Sir Ivan de la Bere  (1946–1960)
 Major General Sir Cyril Harry Colquhoun  (1960–1968)
 Major General Sir Peter Bernard Gillett  (1968–1979)
 Major General Sir Desmond Hind Garrett Rice  (1980–1989)
 Lieutenant Colonel Sir Walter Ross  (1989–1991)
 Lieutenant Colonel Anthony Charles McClure Mather  (1991–1999)
 Lieutenant Colonel Robert Guy Cartwright (1999–2005)
 Lieutenant Colonel Sir Alexander Fergus Matheson of Matheson, 8th Baronet  (2005–2014)
 Lieutenant Colonel James Vernon (2014–2019)
 Lieutenant Colonel Stephen Segrave (2019–present)

References

External links
 
 British Monarchy website

British honours system
Orders of chivalry of the United Kingdom